Allison Patrício, known as Allison (born 31 January 1986) is a Brazilian football player who plays for Mafra.

Club career
He made his professional debut in the Segunda Liga for Mafra on 8 August 2015 in a game against Gil Vicente.

References

1986 births
Living people
Brazilian footballers
Criciúma Esporte Clube players
C.D. Olivais e Moscavide players
Brazilian expatriate footballers
Expatriate footballers in Portugal
C.D. Mafra players
Mesaimeer SC players
Expatriate footballers in Qatar
Liga Portugal 2 players
Qatari Second Division players
Association football forwards